Dichomeris laetitia is a moth of the family Gelechiidae. It was described by Ronald W. Hodges in 1986. It is found in North America, where it has been recorded from Illinois to Oklahoma, Mississippi and Maryland.

References

laetitia
Moths described in 1986